In enzymology, an enoyl-[acyl-carrier-protein] reductase (NADPH, B-specific) is an enzyme that catalyzes the chemical reaction

acyl-[acyl-carrier-protein] + NADP+  trans-2,3-dehydroacyl-[acyl-carrier-protein] + NADPH + H+

Thus, the two substrates of this enzyme are [[acyl-[acyl-carrier-protein]]] and NADP+, whereas its 3 products are [[trans-2,3-dehydroacyl-[acyl-carrier-protein]]], NADPH, and H+.

This enzyme belongs to the family of oxidoreductases, to be specific, those acting on the CH-CH group of donor with NAD+ or NADP+ as acceptor.  The systematic name of this enzyme class is acyl-[acyl-carrier-protein]:NADP+ oxidoreductase (B-specific). Other names in common use include acyl-ACP dehydrogenase, reductase, enoyl-[acyl carrier protein] (reduced nicotinamide, adenine dinucleotide phosphate), NADPH 2-enoyl Co A reductase, enoyl acyl-carrier-protein reductase, enoyl-ACP reductase, and enoyl-[acyl-carrier-protein] reductase (NADPH, B-specific).  This enzyme participates in fatty acid biosynthesis.

Structural studies

References

 
 
 

EC 1.3.1
NADPH-dependent enzymes
Enzymes of known structure